The Pelham Parkway station is a station on the IRT Dyre Avenue Line of the New York City Subway. Located at the intersection of Pelham Parkway North and the Esplanade (erroneously signed as "Esplanade Avenue" in the station) in the Bronx, it is served by the 5 train at all times. This station was built as part of the New York, Westchester and Boston Railway (NYW&B), and opened in 1912. This station closed in 1937 with the NYW&B, but reopened in 1941 as a subway station after the portion of the line in the Bronx was purchased by New York City.

History

Early history 

Pelham Parkway station opened on May 29, 1912 as an express station of the New York, Westchester and Boston Railway (NYW&B). This station was closed on December 12, 1937 when the NYW&B went bankrupt.

The New York City Board of Transportation (BOT) bought the NYW&B within the Bronx north of East 180th Street in April 1940 for $1.8 million and rehabilitated the line. On May 15, 1941, a shuttle service was implemented between Dyre Avenue and East 180th Street using IRT gate cars. The Dyre Avenue Line was connected directly to the White Plains Road Line north of East 180th Street for $3 million and through service began on May 6, 1957.

On February 27, 1962, the New York City Transit Authority announced a $700,000 modernization plan of the Dyre Avenue Line. At the time, the line was served by 9-car trains during the day, and 3-car shuttles overnight. Between 1954 and 1961, ridership on the line increased by 100 percent, owing to the development of the northeast Bronx.

On April 18, 1965, IRT Broadway–Seventh Avenue Line trains and IRT Lexington Avenue Line trains swapped their northern routings, with Broadway–Seventh Avenue 2 trains running via the IRT White Plains Road Line to 241st Street, and Lexington Avenue 5 trains running via the Dyre Avenue Line to Dyre Avenue.

Later years
In 1981, the Metropolitan Transportation Authority (MTA) listed the station among the 69 most deteriorated stations in the subway system. Under the 2015–2019 MTA Capital Program, this station, along with thirty other New York City Subway stations, was slated to undergo a complete overhaul and would be entirely closed for up to six months. Updates would have included cellular service, Wi-Fi, charging stations, improved signage, and improved station lighting. However, these renovations were deferred until the 2020–2024 Capital Program due to a lack of funding.

Station layout 

This station was originally an express station of the New York, Westchester and Boston Railway, with two island platforms and four tracks. An original NYW&B-era train indicator can still be found inside the station.

Today, the two local tracks remain in revenue service, and the southbound express track remains in use as a test track. The northbound express track ends about halfway between the north end of the station and the northern tunnel portal, however, it used to end at a bumper block just south of the station. The station is designed with two island platforms; however it is not considered an express station. The northbound express track had been restored at this station in October 2014. The purpose of the restoration was to serve work trains for the Dyre Avenue Line signal modernization project.  the express tracks are also being used to develop a pilot program for platform screen doors technology.

Pelham Parkway is the only completely underground station on the Dyre Avenue Line and the only underground station in the system not originally built for subway use. It is also the northernmost underground IRT station, and the only four-track underground station in the Bronx.

Exit
The station's only entrance and exit is a head house in the median of the Esplanade north of Pelham Parkway North.

References

External links 

 
 Station Reporter — 5 Train
 The Subway Nut — Pelham Parkway Pictures 
 New York Westchester and Boston Railway - Pelham Parkway Station
 Entrance north of Pelham Parkway from Google Maps Street View
Platforms from Google Maps Street View

IRT Dyre Avenue Line stations
New York City Subway stations in the Bronx
Railway stations in the United States opened in 1912
Railway stations in the United States opened in 1941
1912 establishments in New York City